"Living to Love You" is a song by German singer–songwriter Sarah Connor from her fourth studio album, Naughty but Nice (2005). It was written and produced by Rob Tyger and Kay Denar and released as the album's lead single on 8 November 2004. The song reached number one in Germany and Switzerland, becoming Connor's third consecutive chart-topper on the German Singles Chart and fourth overall. Thus, Connor was the first German artist to accomplish this since Modern Talking in the mid-1980s. "Living to Love You" was the 39th-best-selling single of 2004 and the 35-best-selling single of 2005 in Germany.

Track listings

Personnel and credits 
Credits adapted from the liner notes of Naughty but Nice.

Sarah Connor – vocals
Kay Denar – arranger, producer, writer
Geoge Glueck – executive producer
Rob Tyger – arranger, producer, writer

Charts

Weekly charts

Year-end charts

Certifications

References

2004 singles
2004 songs
Epic Records singles
Number-one singles in Germany
Number-one singles in Switzerland
Sarah Connor (singer) songs
Songs with lyrics by Will Jennings
Songs written by James Horner
Songs written by Kay Denar
Songs written by Rob Tyger
X-Cell Records singles